Summerville Presbyterian Church and Cemetery is a historic Presbyterian church and cemetery located near Lillington, Harnett County, North Carolina. The original church was built in 1811, burned down due to being struck by lightning, and was rebuilt in 1848.  It is a simple rectangular frame building with Greek Revival and Gothic Revival design elements.  The adjacent cemetery includes approximately 150 burial plots and a fine collection of mid and late-19th century markers.

It was listed on the National Register of Historic Places in 1985.

References

Presbyterian churches in North Carolina
Cemeteries in North Carolina
Protestant Reformed cemeteries
Churches on the National Register of Historic Places in North Carolina
Greek Revival church buildings in North Carolina
Gothic Revival church buildings in North Carolina
Churches completed in 1848
19th-century Presbyterian church buildings in the United States
Buildings and structures in Harnett County, North Carolina
National Register of Historic Places in Harnett County, North Carolina